Google Clips is a discontinued miniature clip-on camera device developed by Google. It was announced during Google's "Made By Google" event on 4 October 2017.

It was released for sale on January 27, 2018. With a flashing LED that indicates it is recording, Google Clips automatically captures video clips at moments its machine learning algorithms determine to be interesting or relevant.

Google clips' AI will learn the faces of people so it can learn to take photos with certain people. Google Clips' can automatically set lighting and framing.

It had 16 GB of storage built-in storage and could record clips for up to 3 hours. 
This camera was originally priced at $249 in the United States.

The product was pulled from the Google Store on October 15, 2019. Google has said that the product would be supported until the end of December of 2021.

Reception
The Independent wrote that Google Clips is "an impressive little device, but one that also has the potential to feel very creepy."

According to The Verge's review, it didn't capture anything special over a couple weeks worth of testing. This, added with the steep price, made Google Clips a tough sell.

References

Cameras
Artificial intelligence
Google hardware